Somalia–United Kingdom relations are bilateral relations between Somalia and the United Kingdom.

History
Relations between the territories of present-day Somalia and the United Kingdom date back to the 19th century. In 1884, Britain established the British Somali Coast Protectorate  in northern Somalia (Somaliland) after signing successive treaties with the then ruling Somali Sultans, such as Mohamoud Ali Shire of the Warsangali. In 1900, the Dervish leader Mohammed Abdullah Hassan began a twenty-year resistance movement against British troops. This military campaign eventually came to an end in 1920, after Britain aerially bombarded the Dervish capital of Taleh.Following World War II, Britain retained control of both British Somaliland and Italian Somaliland as protectorates. In 1945, during the Potsdam Conference, the United Nations granted Italy trusteeship of Italian Somaliland, but only under close supervision and on the condition—first proposed by the Somali Youth League (SYL) and other nascent Somali political organizations, such as Hizbia Digil Mirifle Somali (HDMS) and the Somali National League (SNL)—that Somalia achieve independence within ten years. British Somaliland remained a protectorate of Britain until 1960.

In 1948, under pressure from their World War II allies and to the dismay of the Somalis, the British "returned" the Haud (an important Somali grazing area that was presumably 'protected' by British treaties with the Somalis in 1884 and 1886) and the Ogaden to Ethiopia, based on a treaty they signed in 1897 in which the British ceded Somali territory to the Ethiopian Emperor Menelik in exchange for his help against raids by Somali clans. Britain included the proviso that the Somali residents would retain their autonomy, but Ethiopia immediately claimed sovereignty over the area. This prompted an unsuccessful bid by Britain in 1956 to buy back the Somali lands it had turned over. Britain also granted administration of the almost exclusively Somali-inhabited Northern Frontier District (NFD) to Kenyan nationalists despite an informal plebiscite demonstrating the overwhelming desire of the region's population to join the newly formed Somali Republic.

On 1 July 1960, the former British Somaliland and the Trust Territory of Somaliland (the former Italian Somaliland) united as scheduled to form the Somali Republic (Somalia). Between 1963 and 1968, the Somali government severed diplomatic ties with the UK authorities over the Northern Frontier District issue. It later reestablished relations following the rise to power of the Supreme Revolutionary Council in 1969.

After the collapse of the Somali central government and the start of the civil war in 1991, the UK embassy in Mogadishu closed down. In the ensuing period, the British government maintained diplomatic ties with the newly formed Transitional National Government and its successor the Transitional Federal Government. It also engaged Somalia's smaller regional administrations, such as Puntland and Somaliland, to ensure broad-based inclusion in the peace process. In 2012, the British authorities additionally organized the London Conference on Somalia to coordinate the international community's support for the interim Somali government.

Following the establishment of the Federal Government of Somalia in August 2012, the British authorities re-affirmed the UK's continued support for Somalia's government, its territorial integrity and sovereignty.

On the 23rd of March 2017 UK Foreign Minister Boris Johnson chaired a council meeting on the humanitarian and political situation in the Horn of Africa nation in the face of upcoming famine concerns. A week before this Johnson visited Mogadishu to Salk with Somali President Mohamed Abdullahi Mohamed about a strategy to avert any crisis.

Diplomatic missions

Somalia does not have an embassy in London and has no official diplomatic presence in the United Kingdom since the embassy closed in 1994.

On 25 April 2013, the UK became the first western country to re-open its embassy in Somalia, with British First Secretary of State William Hague attending the opening ceremony in Mogadishu. On 6 June 2013, the British government appointed Neil Wigan as the new British Ambassador to Somalia. He succeeded Matt Baugh. On 16 March 2015, Harriet Mathews was appointed as Wigan's successor as ambassador. He is slated to be transferred to another Diplomatic Service office in June 2015.

See also

Foreign relations of Somalia
Foreign relations of the United Kingdom

References

External links
UK Ambassador to Somalia
(The Somalians by Robert Black - https://www.amazon.co.uk/dp/B07QFN3WBH)

 
United Kingdom
Bilateral relations of the United Kingdom
Relations of colonizer and former colony